February 9 - Eastern Orthodox liturgical calendar - February 11

All fixed commemorations below are observed on February 23 by Eastern Orthodox Churches on the Old Calendar.

For February 10th, Orthodox Churches on the Old Calendar commemorate the Saints listed on January 28.

Saints

 Hieromartyr Charalampus, Bishop of Magnesia in Asia Minor, and with him martyrs Porphyrius and Baptus and three women (202)
 Martyrs Ennatha, Valentina, and Paula, Virgin-Martyrs of Palestine (308)
 Saint Zeno the Righteous, the Postman of Emperor Valens, hermit at Antioch (4th century)
 Saint Anastasius II, Patriarch of Jerusalem (706)
 Saint Anna (Ingegerd Olofsdotter of Sweden), wife of Yaroslav I the Wise, of Novgorod and Kiev (1050) (see also: October 17)

Pre-Schism Western saints

 Martyrs Zoticus, Irenaeus, Hyacinth, Amantius and Companions, at Rome (120) 
  Ten Soldier-Martyrs of Rome, buried on the Via Lavicana (c. 250 ?)
 Saint Soteris,  virgin-martyr in Rome under Diocletian (304)
 Saint Silvanus, Bishop of Terracina in Italy, Confessor (c. 443)
 Saint Scholastica of Italy, sister of St. Benedict of Nursia (543)
 Saint Baldegundis, Abbess of Saint-Croix in Poitiers in France (c. 580)
 Saint Desideratus (Désiré), successor of St Avitus as Bishop of Clermont in Auvergne in France (6th century)  (see also: February 11)
 Saint Prothadius (Protagius), successor of St Nicetius as Bishop of Besançon in France (624)
 Saint Austrebertha, Abbess of Abbeville and of Pavilly in northern France (704)
 Saint Trumwine of Abercorn, Bishop of the Southern Picts in Scotland, who retired at Whitby Abbey (c. 704)  (see also: December 2)
 Saint Erluph, Bishop of Werden in Germany, martyred by pagans (830)
 Saint Salvius, Abbot of Albelda in the north of Spain (962)
 Saint Merwinna, Abbess of Romsey Abbey (970)

Post-Schism Orthodox saints

 Synaxis of Novgorod Hierarchs:
 Ioakim Korsunianin (1030), Luke the Jew (1058), Germanus (1095), Arcadius (1163), Gregory (1193), Martyrius (1199), Anthony (1232), Basil (1352), Moses (1362), Symeon (1421), Gennadios (1504), Poimen (1571) and Athonios (1648).
 Saint Prochorus of the Kiev Caves Monastery (1107)
 Saint Basil Kalika, Archbishop of Novgorod the Great and Pskov (1352) 
 Saint John Chimchimeli of Bachkovo and Gremi (13th century)
 Saint Longinus, founder of Koryazhemka Monastery in Vologda, monastic (1540)
 Saint Raphael, Archimandrite (1765), and St. Ioannicius, Hieromonk (1882), of Svatogorsk Monastery.

New martyrs and confessors

 New Hieromartyr Konstantin Veretsky, of Rostov-on-Don (1918)
 New Hieromartyrs Peter and Valerian, Priests (1930)

Other commemorations

 Synaxis of the "Areovindus" ("Fiery Vision") Icon of the Most Holy Theotokos.
 Commemoration of the deliverance of the island of Zakynthos from the plague by Saint Charalampus (1728)

Icon gallery

Notes

References

Sources
 February 10 / 23. Orthodox Calendar (Pravoslavie.ru).
 February 23 / 10. Holy Trinity Russian Orthodox Church (A parish of the Patriarchate of Moscow).
 February 10. OCA - The Lives of the Saints.
 The Autonomous Orthodox Metropolia of Western Europe and the Americas. St. Hilarion Calendar of Saints for the year of our Lord 2004. St. Hilarion Press (Austin, TX). p. 14.
 The Tenth Day of the Month of February. Orthodoxy in China.
 February 10. Latin Saints of the Orthodox Patriarchate of Rome.
 The Roman Martyrology. Transl. by the Archbishop of Baltimore. Last Edition, According to the Copy Printed at Rome in 1914. Revised Edition, with the Imprimatur of His Eminence Cardinal Gibbons. Baltimore: John Murphy Company, 1916. pp. 43–44.
 Rev. Richard Stanton. A Menology of England and Wales, or, Brief Memorials of the Ancient British and English Saints Arranged According to the Calendar, Together with the Martyrs of the 16th and 17th Centuries. London: Burns & Oates, 1892. pp. 61–62.
Greek Sources
 Great Synaxaristes:  10 Φεβουαριου. Μεγασ Συναξαριστησ.
  Συναξαριστής. 10 Φεβρουαρίου. Ecclesia.gr. (H Εκκλησια Τησ Ελλαδοσ).
Russian Sources
  23 февраля (10 февраля). Православная Энциклопедия под редакцией Патриарха Московского и всея Руси Кирилла (электронная версия). (Orthodox Encyclopedia - Pravenc.ru).

February in the Eastern Orthodox calendar